Methylmalonyl-CoA is the thioester consisting of coenzyme A linked to methylmalonic acid.  It is an important intermediate in the biosynthesis of succinyl-CoA, which plays an essential role in the tricarboxylic acid cycle (aka the Citric Acid Cycle, or Krebs Cycle). The compound is sometimes referred to as "methylmalyl-CoA".

Biosynthesis and metabolism 

Methylmalonyl-CoA results from the metabolism of fatty acid with an odd number of carbons or from cholesterol side-chains, forming Propionyl-CoA. Propionyl-CoA and bicarbonate are converted to Methylmalonyl-CoA by the enzyme propionyl-CoA Carboxylase.  It then is converted into succinyl-CoA by methylmalonyl-CoA mutase (MUT). This reaction is a reversible isomerization. In this way, the compound enters the Citric Acid Cycle. The following diagram demonstrates the aforementioned reaction:

Propionyl CoA + Bicarbonate → Methylmalonyl CoA → Succinyl CoA

Vitamin B12 
Vitamin B12 plays an integral role in this reaction. Coenzyme B12 (adenosyl-cobalamin) is an organometallic form of Vitamin B12 and serves as the cofactor of Methylmalonyl-CoA mutase, which is an essential enzyme in the human body. The transformation of Methylmalonyl-CoA to Succinyl-CoA by this enzyme is a radical reaction.

Related diseases

Methylmalonic Acidemia (MMA) 

This disease occurs when methylmalonyl-CoA mutase is unable to isomerize sufficient amounts of methylmalonyl-CoA into succinyl-CoA. This causes a buildup of propionic and/or methylmalonic acid, which has effects on infants ranging from severe brain damage to death. The disease is linked to Vitamin B12, which is the metabolic precursor to methylmalonyl-CoA mutase.

References 

Thioesters of coenzyme A